Semarak Stadium is a football stadium in the Sawah Lebar District city of Bengkulu, Indonesia. It is the home stadium of PS Bengkulu. The stadium has a capacity of 15,000.

Tournament

References

Football venues in Indonesia
Buildings and structures in Bengkulu